Rogienice Piaseczne   is a village in the administrative district of Gmina Mały Płock, within Kolno County, Podlaskie Voivodeship, in north-eastern Poland.

The village has a population of 90.

References

Rogienice Piaseczne